Fred Wallace Haise Jr. (born November 14, 1933) is an American former NASA astronaut, engineer, fighter pilot with the U.S. Marine Corps and U.S. Air Force, and a test pilot. He is one of only 24 people to have flown to the Moon, having flown as Lunar Module Pilot on Apollo 13. He was to have been the sixth person to walk on the Moon, but the Apollo 13 landing mission was aborted en route. 

Haise went on to fly five Space Shuttle Approach and Landing Tests in 1977, and retired from NASA in 1979.

Early life, education and flight experience 

Born on November 14, 1933, and raised in Biloxi, Mississippi, to Fred Wallace Haise Sr. (1903–1960) and Lucille ( Blacksher) Haise (1913–2005). He attended Biloxi High School, from which he graduated in 1950, and Perkinston Junior College (now Mississippi Gulf Coast Community College), with original aims of a career in journalism, receiving an Associate of Arts degree in 1952. He was a Boy Scout, earning the rank of Star Scout. Eligible for the draft and despite being apprehensive of flying, he joined the Naval Aviation Cadet (NAVCAD) training program. Haise underwent Naval Aviator training from 1952 to 1954. He served as a U.S. Marine Corps fighter pilot, with VMF-533, then VMF-114 on the F2H-4 Banshee and F9F-8 Cougar at MCAS Cherry Point, North Carolina, from March 1954 to September 1956. Haise also served as a tactics and all-weather flight instructor in the U.S. Navy Advanced Training Command at NAS Kingsville, Texas.

Haise has accumulated 9,300 hours flying time, including 6,200 hours in jets.

After his military service, Haise returned to school and graduated with a Bachelor of Science degree with honors in aeronautical engineering from the University of Oklahoma in 1959, concurrently serving for two years in the Oklahoma Air National Guard, as a fighter interceptor pilot with the 185th Fighter Interceptor Squadron, flying the F-86D. He then worked for the newly created National Aeronautics and Space Administration (NASA), first as a research pilot at the Lewis Research Center near Cleveland. His Air National Guard unit was called up during the Berlin Crisis of 1961 and he served ten months as a fighter pilot in the United States Air Force. He was a tactical fighter pilot and chief of the 164th Standardization-Evaluation Flight of the 164th Tactical Fighter Squadron at Mansfield Lahm Air National Guard Base, Ohio,  flying the F-84F.

Haise completed post-graduate courses at the U.S. Air Force Aerospace Research Pilot School (Class 64A) at Edwards Air Force Base, California in 1964, and attended the six-week Harvard Business School's Advanced Management Program in 1972.

NASA career 

In 1966, Haise was one of 19 new astronauts selected for NASA Astronaut Group 5. He had already been working with NASA for several years as a civilian research pilot. He was the first astronaut among his class to be assigned to a mission, serving as backup Lunar Module Pilot for both Apollo 8 and Apollo 11.

Apollo 13 

According to the rotation of crews during Apollo, Haise was originally assigned as the Lunar Module Pilot for Apollo 14, but his crew was switched to Apollo 13 so that Alan Shepard could have more training time. He flew as the Lunar Module Pilot on the aborted Apollo 13 lunar mission in 1970. Due to the distance between the Earth and Moon during the mission, Haise, Jim Lovell, and Jack Swigert hold the record for the farthest distance from the Earth ever traveled by human beings. Haise and Jack Swigert were the first people from Group 5 to fly in space. During this flight Haise developed a urinary tract infection and later kidney infections. These caused him to be in pain for most of the trip.

Haise was slated to become the sixth human to walk on the Moon during Apollo 13 behind Lovell, who was to be fifth. Alan Shepard and Edgar Mitchell eventually became the fifth and sixth, respectively, on Apollo 14, which completed Apollo 13's mission to the Fra Mauro formation.

Haise remained in the astronaut rotation and served as the backup mission commander for Apollo 16. Though there was no formal selection, Haise was prospectively slated to command Apollo 19 with William R. Pogue as Command Module Pilot and Gerald P. Carr as Lunar Module Pilot. However, the mission was canceled in late 1970 due to budget cuts.

Space Shuttle approach and landing tests 

After completing his backup assignment on Apollo 16, Haise moved to the Space Shuttle program. In 1977, he participated in the program's Approach and Landing Tests (ALT) at Edwards Air Force Base. Along with C. Gordon Fullerton as pilot, Haise as commander piloted the Space Shuttle Enterprise in free flight to three successful landings after being released from the Shuttle Carrier Aircraft. The tests successfully verified the shuttle's flight characteristics, an important step toward the overall success of the program.

Haise was assigned to command STS-2A, with Jack R. Lousma as pilot, the second Space Shuttle mission, which would have delivered the Teleoperator Retrieval System that would have boosted Skylab to a higher orbit, preserving it for future use. Delays in the Shuttle program development as well as an unexpected increase in Skylab's orbital decay led to the mission being canceled. Skylab was destroyed upon entering the Earth's atmosphere in July 1979, while the Space Shuttle did not launch until April 1981.

In June 1979, Haise left NASA to become a test pilot and executive with Grumman Aerospace Corporation, where he remained until retiring in 1996.  He was the only one of the four astronauts who conducted the Enterprise landing tests not to fly in space on the Shuttle.

Personal life 
Haise has four children with his first wife Mary Griffin Grant, whom he married in 1954 and divorced in 1978: Mary (b. 1956), Frederick (b. 1958), Stephen (b. 1961), and Thomas (b. 1970). He married Frances Patt Price, in 1979. On February 7, 2022, Frances died.

On August 22, 1973, Haise was piloting a Convair BT-13 belonging to the Commemorative Air Force that had been converted to look like an Aichi D3A "Val" torpedo bomber for the 1970 film Tora! Tora! Tora!. While attempting a landing go around at Scholes Field in Galveston, Texas, an undetermined power plant failure led to a crash landing. Haise suffered second‐degree burns over 50 percent of his body in the post crash fire.

Organizations 
Haise is a fellow of the American Astronautical Society (AAS) and the Society of Experimental Test Pilots (SETP); member, Tau Beta Pi, Sigma Gamma Tau, and Phi Theta Kappa; and honorary member, National WWII Glider Pilots Association.

Awards and honors 

Haise's other awards include the American Institute of Aeronautics and Astronautics (AIAA) Haley Astronautics Award for 1971; the American Astronautical Society Flight Achievement Awards for 1970 and 1977; the City of New York Gold Medal in 1970; the City of Houston Medal for Valor in 1970; the Jeff Davis Award (1970); the Mississippi Distinguished Civilian Service Medal (1970); the American Defense Ribbon; the SETP's Ray E. Tenhoff Award for 1966; the A. B. Honts Trophy as the outstanding graduate of Class 64A from the Aerospace Research Pilot School in 1964; an honorary doctor of science degree from Western Michigan University (1970); the JSC Special Achievement Award (1978); the Soaring Society of America's Certificate of Achievement Award (1978); the General Thomas D. White USAF Space Trophy for 1977; the SETP's Iven C. Kincheloe Award (1978); and the Air Force Association's David C. Schilling Award (1978).

He received the Presidential Medal of Freedom, NASA Distinguished Service Medal, and NASA Exceptional Service Medal.

He was inducted into the International Space Hall of Fame in 1983 and the Aerospace Walk of Honor in 1995. He was also one of 24 Apollo astronauts inducted into the U.S. Astronaut Hall of Fame on October 4, 1997.

On February 13, 2022, the City of Biloxi unveiled a statue of Haise in the parking lot of the historic Biloxi Lighthouse. Haise was present at the ceremony and had his handprints set in concrete at the statue's base prior to its unveiling. The statue was created by Mississippi artist Mary Ott Tremel Davidson.

In September of 2023, Haise will be inducted into the National Aviation Hall of Fame in Dayton, Ohio.

See also 
 List of spaceflight records
 The Astronaut Monument
 Jack Swigert
 Jim Lovell

References

Sources

External links 

Fred Haise's Personal Archives
Space and Things Podcast - STP47 - So Much More Than Apollo 13 - An Interview With Fred Haise
Interview with Fred Haise for NOVA series: To the Moon WGBH Educational Foundation, raw footage, 1998
Spacefacts biography of Fred Haise
Haise at Encyclopedia of Science

Short audio interview on Astrotalkuk.org during his visit to UK in 2009

 
1933 births
Living people
1970 in spaceflight
American aviators
Apollo program astronauts
Apollo 13
United States Naval Aviators
Aviators from Mississippi
People from Biloxi, Mississippi
Biloxi High School alumni
United States Marine Corps officers
American business executives
University of Oklahoma alumni
Presidential Medal of Freedom recipients
Recipients of the NASA Distinguished Service Medal
United States Astronaut Hall of Fame inductees
U.S. Air Force Test Pilot School alumni
American aerospace engineers
American test pilots
NASA civilian astronauts
Mississippi Gulf Coast Community College alumni
20th-century American businesspeople